1,3-Cycloheptadiene is a highly flammable cycloalkene that occurs as a colorless clear liquid.

References

Cycloalkenes
Conjugated dienes
Seven-membered rings